SPEED Circus is the first mini album (EP) by South Korean boy group Speed. The mini album was preceded by promotional singles  "Don’t Tease Me!" It was the last album to feature Taewoon due to his departure the following year.

Track listing

Charts

Album charts

Single charts
Speed Circus
놀리러 간다 (Don't Tease Me!)

Release history

References

2014 albums
Genie Music albums